"So You Wanna Be A Rock'n'Roll Star" is a 1982 greatest hits mini-album by New Zealand band Th' Dudes.  It reached No. 27 on the New Zealand music charts.  It was later packaged with the Hello Sailor mini-album Last Chance To Dance and released by Festival Records in 1991.

Track listing

Credits
 Artwork – Peter Urlich
 Bass – Lez White
 Drums – Bruce Hambling
 Producer – Rob Aicken
 Vocals – Peter Urlich
 Written-By, Guitar, Engineer – Ian Morris
 Written-By, Guitar, Vocals – Dave Dobbyn

Chart positions

1991 repackaged album

In 1991 a repackaged CD version was released, combining So You Wanna Be A Rock'n'Roll Star with the Hello Sailor's Last Chance To Dance mini-greatest hits. The album reached number 35 on the New Zealand charts.

Track listing

Chart positions

References

1982 greatest hits albums
Th' Dudes compilation albums
Hello Sailor (band) compilation albums
1991 greatest hits albums
Festival Records compilation albums